Tiruvotriyur K P Shankar is a social worker, businessman, and Indian politician and a member of the Dravida Munnetra Kazhagam party. He was elected as a member of the Tamil Nadu Legislative Assembly from the Tiruvottiyur constituency in 2021. He was served a Councillor of the Greater Chennai Corporation ward No.5 at Tiruvottiyur Zone and represents the Dravida Munnetra Kazhagam. He is the Brother of former DMK MLA K.P.P.Samy.

He was removed from the post of the party's Tiruvottiyur West area secretary after he had reportedly attacked a city corporation engineer who was overseeing road-laying work in his constituency.

Electoral performance

Sources 

 Election Commission of India
 K.P.Shankar(DMK):Constituency- THIRUVOTTIYUR(THIRUVALLUR) - Affidavit Information of Candidate:
 Thiruvottiyur Election Result 2021 LIVE: DMK's KP Shankar wins against AIADMK's K Kuppan
 Thiruvottiyur, Tamil Nadu Assembly election result 2021

References 

Year of birth missing (living people)
Living people
Indian social workers
Indian businesspeople
Dravida Munnetra Kazhagam politicians
Place of birth missing (living people)
Tamil Nadu MLAs 2021–2026